The Rögling Formation is a geologic formation in Germany. It preserves fossils dating back to the Jurassic period.

See also

 List of fossiliferous stratigraphic units in Germany

References
 

South German Jurassic
Geologic formations of Germany
Kimmeridgian Stage
Jurassic System of Europe